Murat Adigüzel (born 15 January 1992) is a German-Turkish footballer who plays as a forward for FV Eppelborn.

Career
Adigüzel made his professional debut for SV Elversberg in the 3. Liga on 2 March 2014, coming on as a substitute in the 65th minute for Sascha Wolfert in the 2–0 away loss against RB Leipzig.

References

External links
 
 

1992 births
Living people
People from Homburg, Saarland
German people of Turkish descent
Footballers from Saarland
German footballers
Turkish footballers
Association football forwards
3. Liga players
SVN Zweibrücken players
FSV Salmrohr players
SV Elversberg players
SV Röchling Völklingen players